Mario Abboud (born 1 August 1981 in Beirut) is a Lebanese professional basketball center currently playing with Sporting Al Riyadi Beirut of the Lebanese Basketball League.

Professional sports career
Abboud started his basketball career with in the 2012-13 season with Bejjeh SC when he was recruited by Sporting Al Riyadi Beirut Team. He joined Al Riyadi Beirut.

References

1981 births
Living people
Lebanese men's basketball players
Centers (basketball)
Lebanese American University alumni
Sportspeople from Beirut
Basketball players at the 2006 Asian Games
Asian Games competitors for Lebanon
Al Riyadi Club Beirut basketball players